The National Schools Cup (currently known as the Continental Tyres Schools Cup for sponsorship reasons) are a set of annual English schools' rugby union cup competitions, with the U18 Cup being the main competition. The finals of the Cup and Vase competitions are held at Twickenham Stadium, whilst finals for the Plate and Bowl competitions are held at another venue, usually of a Premiership Club. Cup and Vase Semi-finals are also held at a neutral venues. Competitions are held at the U18 and U15 age group levels. At each age level there are several competitions.

All fixtures, results and match reports posted on The Rugby Football Union's website. Up until 2015–16, the Vase was awarded for both age groups in a secondary competition for schools knocked out in the early rounds of the Cup. Since 2016–17, the Cup and Vase competition in both age groups have been separated, with those eliminated in the first round of the Cup going down into the Plate competition, with those eliminated in the first round of the Vase competition going down to the Bowl competition.

Format
Games are played in a direct knockout format, with 8 regions of up to 32 teams each depending on the competition. Teams in the Cup and Vase are decided based on previous years results, with stronger teams entering the Cup, and weaker teams entering the Vase. Round 1 losers of the Cup and Vase drop down to the Plate and Bowl respectively. After the 8 regional teams are decided, a set of national Quarter-Finals, Semi-Finals and Finals follow, with the Final being between a  Southern (Southwest and London & South East) region and Northern (North and Midlands) region team.

U18 competitions complete Rounds 1 to 5 and the national Quarter Final before Christmas, with the Semi-Final and Final rounds following in March. At U15 level, Rounds 1 to 4 are completed before Christmas, with Round 5 in January, Quarter-Finals in February, and Semi-Final and Final in March.

List of Cup Finals
The U18 Cup commenced in the 1990-91 season, and has been the 1st tier tournament throughout, except for between 2014 and 2020, whereby it was the 2nd tier tournament.

Winners

Results by School

Other Competitions

U18 Champions Trophy
This competition was introduced in the 2014-15 season. This became the 1st tier tournament for the U18 section until its abolishment after the 2019-20 season final.

The competition was abolished after the 2019-20 season final.

U18 Plate
The U18 Plate was introduced in the 2016-17 season, and is for teams that lose in the 1st round of the Cup. It is currently the 2nd tier tournament.

U18 Vase
The U18 Vase was introduced in the 1995/96 season, originally as the U18 Plate, before becoming the U18 vase in the 1998/99 season. It was originally meant for teams exiting the first few rounds of the Cup, but since 2016-17, the vase has been for weaker teams, with 1st round losers going into the U18 Bowl. It is currently the 3rd tier tournament.

U18 Bowl
The U18 Bowl was introduced in the 2016-17 season, and is for teams that lose in the 1st round of the Vase. It is currently the 4th tier tournament.

U15 Cup
The U15 Cup was introduced in the 1987-88 season, and was the 1st competition out of the current set competitions.

U15 Plate
The U15 Plate was introduced in the 2016-17 season, and is for teams that lose in the 1st round of the Cup. It is currently the 2nd tier tournament.

U15 Vase
The U15 Vase was introduced in the 2003/04 season. It was originally meant for teams exiting the first few rounds of the Cup, but since 2016-17, the Vase has been for weaker teams, with 1st round losers going into the U15 Bowl. It is currently the 3rd tier tournament.

U15 Bowl
The U15 Plate was introduced in the 2016-17 season, and is for teams that lose in the 1st round of the Vase. It is currently the 4th tier tournament.

References

https://web.archive.org/web/20071213022516/http://www.schoolsrugby.co.uk/tnt_DailyMailArchive3.asp

Rugby union cup competitions in England
School sport in the United Kingdom
Youth sport in England
High school rugby union